Robert Marshall Root (1863–1937), was a well-known Midwestern tonalist and impressionist artist.  Born to John and Eunice Root, working-class parents, in Shelbyville, Illinois in 1863, young Robert showed great artistic promise from an early age.  The small central Illinois town where Root began his life was part of the very judicial circuit where a lawyer by the name of Abraham Lincoln practiced law and debated local politician Anthony Thornton in 1856 over the merits of slavery in the Kansas Territory.  Root later memorialized this famous moment in a portrait that still hangs today in the Shelby County Courthouse.

Root saw many phases of his life.  He saw poverty, wealth, culture, and ignorance.  Root was concerned with beauty in an era of expansion, mud, saloons, and political rallies.  He became an artist because that was the only destiny he had been born to.  He left the raw, colorful country town and the crude prairies that were still making history and went to St. Louis and later Paris, France.  At those places he found beauty, sophistication, culture and kindred spirits.  He also found high honor, praise and encouragement; but when his schooling was completed he came home and stayed there.

Youth

Root began his academic studies in the Shelby County school system.  While in this youth, young Robert became enamored with the various magazines and comics that he would read at his family's general store in Shelbyville.  Upon graduating from high school in approximately 1881, young Robert was accepted into studies at the prestigious Cooper Union in New York City to pursue a career in the visual arts.  Unfortunately, Robert returned home only after a few months of study in New York City.  He started to reach down into his artistic will and began a career as a sign painter in Shelbyville.  Given his ability, Root began to make many friends in and around Shelbyville.  He was able to parlay this success into an application and subsequent admission into Washington University in St. Louis.  While there, Root excelled in his artistic studies, learning a great appreciation for the aesthetic and serene.  He graduated from the University, earning the highest academic and artistic honors.

References

1863 births
1937 deaths
People from Shelbyville, Illinois
Painters from Illinois
Tonalism
American Impressionist painters
19th-century American painters
20th-century American painters
19th-century American male artists
20th-century American male artists
Washington University in St. Louis alumni